The Ealing Art Guild was founded in 1910, to further the interests of local artists of all disciplines, whether professional, amateur or lay. The society later broadened its scope to become the Ealing Arts Club and, in due course, became the present day Ealing Art Group, which has a membership of around 120.

Origins and development

According to an early history of the club, written by J. Lawson Petingale to celebrate its first 50 years, John Dovaston and Arthur Sortwell had the idea of forming a local art society in July 1910. On 15 November a group gathered in the studio of Dovaston’s sister Margaret to discuss and constitute the Ealing Art Guild, with Margaret appointed its secretary, and Adolphus (her father) the chairman – a position he held until 1935, when he became president. On 29 November the Committee of Management met to draw up rules for the new organisation, the second of which stated "That the Guild do consist of Local Painters, Sculptors, Architects, Designers, Etchers, Engravers, Black and white Artists, and Artcraft workers (Professional and Amateur) and Lay Members."

In December 1921 the committee recommended that the guild's name be changed to the Ealing Arts Club, to reflect its expansion. The new name was adopted at a reception and general meeting on 22 January 1922, with the formation of the Drama and Music Sections. In 1932 the Amenities Group was added, and became active in the borough by writing letters and agitating for the retention of historic structures in Ealing, at a time when much new development was underway. The club expanded again when the Literature Group came into being in 1948; and all Sections were renamed Groups at the same time. The minutes record, however, that there was a growing wish among the artist members to become more independent, both organisationally and financially. Separation from the Ealing Arts Club came in 1983, with Bert Wright, PPRSA, FRSA chairing the new Ealing Art Group, and Charles Gould its secretary. The group devised its own logo at the time, which was redesigned by EAG member Peter Averson-Maunder in the 1990s. The remaining Ealing Arts Club gradually disbanded after the separation.

Present at first meeting

The original list, in the meeting minutes, did not include given names. The identities and addresses of some participants have been derived from the 1911 census.

Some key office holders

Exhibitions
The first exhibition was hastily staged in Ealing Town Hall, in conjunction with a "Grand Shakespearean Bazaar", on 11 and 12 November 1910.

Thereafter, annual art exhibitions have been held every October/November from 1911, with the exception of the World War II years. Margaret Dovaston organised the first, and the 100th was held in 2015. The 102nd was held at St. Barnabas Church, Pittshanger Lane on 7–11 November 2017. A small number of exhibition catalogues still exist, and there are newspaper reports of a few others.

The 1911 exhibition opened on 23 October at St George's Hall. The works of nearly 40 local artists were displayed, with 200–300 visitors per day attending. But it proved to be very expensive, and so later exhibitions were held in Ealing – in the Town Hall or nearby in The Mall. In 1954, the venue moved to Ealing College in the Avenue. In 1931 the club held a seven days’ celebration of its coming of age, inaugurated when Terrick Williams, A.R.A. opened the annual exhibition. The Sunday Times reported that The exhibits in this year’s exhibition number nearly 200, and reveal a high quality of work and a wide catholicity of taste. Among the examples most admired by the visitors were those of Mr. and Mrs. James Alphege Brewer,
 Mrs. Ethel M. Found, Miss Elizabeth King, Miss Margaret Dovaston, and Messrs. J. W. T. Vinall, Terence H. Lambert, Henry Charles Brewer, T. W. Cole, Albert H. Howe, Charles F. Angrave, Spencer H. Lawrence, and P. M. Andrews.

More recent exhibitions are illustrated on the Ealing Art Group's website.

Early drama section productions

The Drama Section gave its first public performance in November 1923 at the Park Theatre, Hanwell, with a production of Gertrude Jennings’ popular comedy "The Young Person in Pink". On 24 November 1926, at the same theatre, the club staged "Twelfth Night", the proceeds from which were donated to a fund for replacing the Shakespeare Memorial Theatre, destroyed by fire in March of that year.

In 1927 the club's production of "She Stoops to Conquer" contributed to funds for the King Edward Memorial Hospital. Four years later – in the club's twenty-first year – came an ambitious and successful staging of "Up the Arts", a revue showing the arts through the ages, with more than 100 performers taking part. Painting, sculpture, poetry, music, literature, and drama were all represented in the scenes and tableaux. The book and lyrics were written by the president, Mr. T. C. F. Smith, with the incidental music, choruses, and solos composed by Mr. J. R. Parton. A special overture was composed by Mr. Sherard J. H. Prynne.

Music section

It is not known exactly when this section was formed, but an advertisement appeared in 1926 stating that "Amateur string players and vocalists living in or near Ealing would be welcomed as members of the Ealing Arts Club. Small string orchestra and madrigal choir. Harold E. West, 8. Liverpool Road, Ealing, W.5."

Notes

References 

British artist groups and collectives